Michalis Christofi (born 24 July 1969) is a retired Cypriot football goalkeeper.

References

1969 births
Living people
Cypriot footballers
Apollon Limassol FC players
AEL Limassol players
Association football goalkeepers
Cypriot First Division players
Cyprus international footballers